Ferdinand Marie Ismaël de Lesseps (27 November 1871 – 30 September 1915), known as Ismaël de Lesseps, was a French fencer. He competed in the individual and team sabre events at the 1908 Summer Olympics. He was killed in action during World War I. He was the brother of Bertrand Marie de Lesseps and son of Ferdinand de Lesseps.

See also
 List of Olympians killed in World War I

References

External links
 

1871 births
1915 deaths
French male sabre fencers
Olympic fencers of France
Fencers at the 1908 Summer Olympics
Counts of France
Ismael
Fencers from Paris
French military personnel killed in World War I